CCZ (in capital letters) may mean:

 Congestion Charging Zone, a car traffic-reducing policy
 Operation Cyber Condition Zebra, a network operations campaign
 Coca-Cola Zero, the second published Diet version of Coke
 Clarion-Clipperton Zone